Tirumala Express is a train that shuttles between Visakhapatnam and Kadapa. Previously the train used to run between Visakhapatnam and Tirupati and has been extended to Kadapa from 31 January 2019.

Route 
17487/17488 runs daily from both the sides via Tirupati Main.

Coach replacement and coach composition
In February 2021, it has replaced into LHB coach

 13-Sleeper
 2 Three-tier AC
 3 Two-tier AC
 4 Second class (unreserved)
 1 LSLRD
 1 EOG

Routes and halts
 Visakhapatnam
 Duvvada
 Anakapalle
 Tuni
 Samalkot
 Anaparthi
 Rajahmundry
 Eluru
 Vijayawada
 Tenali
 Ongole
 Kavali
 Nellore
 Gudur
 Srikalahasti
 Renigunta
 Tirupati Main
 Koduru
 Razampeta
 Kadapa

Rake Sharing
Korba-Visakhapatnam Express

References

Transport in Tirupati
Transport in Visakhapatnam
Railway services introduced in 1970
Rail transport in Andhra Pradesh
Named passenger trains of India
Express trains in India